Nevlunghavn is a village in Larvik municipality, Norway. Before the municipal merge in 1988 it was a part of Brunlanes municipality. Nevlunghavn has grown together with the adjacent village Helgeroa. The two villages have a combined population of 1,573.

Nevlunghavn is the southernmost point in Vestfold County, excluding islands, islets and skerries. It was located in southernmost Brunlanes municipality, and was the administrative centre of the former municipality. It is home to a fishing pier and boat harbor, and experiences significant summer tourism. Nearby is Oddane Sand, a beach used for swimming, camping and other recreational activities.

Tourism
Nevlunghavn is located in a harbor which lies four kilometers south of Helgeroa village in Larvik municipality. A former pilot station, Nevlunghavn is now a fishing village characterized by its many fishing boats and fishers bringing their catch ashore. The harbor also houses several oceanside seafood restaurants and bars. Nevlunghavn is the southernmost point in mainland Vestfold County, excluding islands and islets. Gurvika, Oddanesand and Mølen lie immediately west of Nevlunghavn. While campsites are found at Gurvika and Oddanesand, Mølen is one of Larvik's most popular tourist attractions.

The small fishing village and pilot harbor is located on the coast and has managed to preserve its original character. Nevlunghavn has a yachting harbor, a fishing harbor, and numerous restaurants serving freshly caught seafood such as crab, fish, and shrimp.

Nevlunghavn is home to a café, campground and beach in Oddane Sand. From the campsite it is a 90-minute hike to the Bronze Age graves at Mølen.

Nevlunghavn has been placed on the United Nations' list of places worthy of preservation.

References

Villages in Vestfold og Telemark
Larvik